The Northern Front  was an army group of the Imperial Russian Army during the World War I. It was responsible for carrying out operations against the Central Powers along a front line that stretched 280 kilometers, from Riga in the north down to northern Belarus. It was established in August 1915 when the Northwestern Front was split into the Northern and Western Front following the Great Retreat, and existed until the demobilization of the Russian army in 1918 due to the unrest from the Russian Revolution. In 1917 it had a total troop strength of 1.4 million men.

Armies of the Northern Front
The following field armies were part of the Northern Front.
5th Army (Aug. 1915 – early 1918)
6th Army (Aug, 1915 – Dec. 1916)
12th Army (Aug. 1915 – early 1918)
1st Army (Apr. 1916 – Jul. 1917, Sept. 1917 – early 1918)

Commanders of the Northern Front
The following officers served as commanders of the Northern Front.
18 Aug. 1915 – 6 Dec. 1915: General of Infantry Nikolai Ruzsky
6 Dec. 1915 – 6 Feb. 1916: General of Infantry Pavel Plehve
6 Feb. 1916 – 22 Jul. 1916: General of Infantry Aleksey Kuropatkin
1 Aug. 1916 – 25 Apr. 1917: General of Infantry Nikolai Ruzsky
29 Apr. 1917 – 1 Jun. 1917: General of Cavalry Abraham Dragomirov
1 Jun. 1917 – 29 Aug. 1917: General of Infantry Vladislav Klembovsky
29 Aug. 1917 – 9 Sept. 1917: Major-General Mikhail Bonch-Bruevich
9 Sept. 1917 – 14 Nov. 1917: General of Infantry Vladimir Cheremisov
14 Nov. 1917 – 22 Nov. 1917: Major-General Sergei Lukirsky
22 Nov. 1917– 12 Dec. 1917: Lieutenant-General Vasily Fedorovich Novitsky

References

Notes

See also
List of Imperial Russian Army formations and units
Northern Front electoral district (Russian Constituent Assembly election, 1917)

Fronts of the Russian Empire
Military units and formations established in 1915
1915 establishments in the Russian Empire